is a Japanese badminton player from the Yonex team.

Career 
Sakuramoto who educated at the Kyushu International University High School, won the girls' doubles bronze medal at the 2011 Asian Junior Badminton Championships. She also won 2012 gold and 2013 bronze in the mixed team event. In 2017, she became the women's doubles runner-up at the Osaka International tournament partnered with Yukiko Takahata. She won her first senior international title at the Spanish International tournament with Takahata.

Achievements

Asian Junior Championships 
Girls' doubles

BWF World Tour (9 titles, 2 runners-up) 
The BWF World Tour, which was announced on 19 March 2017 and implemented in 2018, is a series of elite badminton tournaments sanctioned by the Badminton World Federation (BWF). The BWF World Tour is divided into levels of World Tour Finals, Super 1000, Super 750, Super 500, Super 300 (part of the HSBC World Tour), and the BWF Tour Super 100.

Women's doubles

BWF Grand Prix (1 runners-up) 
The BWF Grand Prix had two levels, the Grand Prix and Grand Prix Gold. It was a series of badminton tournaments sanctioned by the Badminton World Federation (BWF) and played between 2007 and 2017.

Women's doubles

  BWF Grand Prix Gold tournament
  BWF Grand Prix tournament

BWF International Challenge/Series (1 titles, 3 runners-up) 
Women's doubles

  BWF International Challenge tournament
  BWF International Series tournament

References

External links 
 

Living people
1995 births
Sportspeople from Fukuoka Prefecture
Japanese female badminton players